Muhammad Fazly bin Mazlan (born 22 December 1993) is a Malaysian professional footballer who plays for Malaysia Super League club Selangor and the Malaysia national team. He has played in a multitude of roles, right and left wing, but has since blossomed as a left-back.

Club career

Early career
Born in Klang and grew up in Muar, Fazly began his career with MP Muar, his local club in Muar, before joining the youth setup of Johor State Football Association at age 17.

Johor and Johor Darul Ta'zim
He started out in Johor's youth system, playing for the under 17 and under 19 teams, before being promoted to the Johor first team in 2011 season. He was named for Johor Darul Ta'zim squad on 23 December 2013, where he was assigned the shirt number 33 and later 42. He made his debut in a Malaysian Super League against Perak on 18 January 2014 and scored his first professional goal for Johor Darul Takzim F.c on 25 March 2014.
He made his AFC Cup 2015 debut against South China AA on 9 March 2010.
He also became one of three Johor Darul Ta'zim's youngest ever player in a competitive fixture in AFC Cup 2015.
In 2016, he was assigned the shirt number 15.

Johor Darul Takzim II
Bojan Hodak decided to transfer several players from Johor Darul Takzim first team, including him to 2nd team to help them get match fitness, recovery from any injuries and to help youngster in Johor Darul Takzim II After 4 months in 2nd team his was called up to join Johor DT by new appointed head coach Mario Gomez in 2015 April transfer window.

Sri Pahang (loan)
In January 2020, Fazly moved to Pahang as a loan player.

Selangor

On 26 December 2021, Fazly moved to Selangor and joined as a free agent after his contract with childhood club, Johor Darul Ta'zim has been expired. He signed with the club for a two-year deal. In 2022 season, Fazly made 28 appearances in all competition for Selangor.

International Careers
Fazly was called up to the 2015 FIFA World Cup qualification campaign. He made his debut against Palestine on 12 November 2015. In November 2022, he was called up to the national team for the 2022 AFF Mitsubishi Electric Cup.

Career statistics

International

Honours

Club
Johor Darul Ta'zim
 Malaysia Super League: 2014, 2015, 2016, 2017
 Malaysia Charity Shield: 2015, 2016
 AFC Cup: 2015
 Malaysia FA Cup: 2016
 Malaysia Cup: 2017

Johor Darul Ta'zim II F.C.
 Malaysia Challenge Cup(1): 2019

References

External links
 
 goal.com
 johorsoutherntigers.com.my 
 
 footballmalaysia.com 

1993 births
Living people
People from Johor
People from Muar
Malaysian footballers
Malaysia Super League players
Johor Darul Ta'zim F.C. players
Association football forwards
Association football midfielders
AFC Cup winning players
Malaysia international footballers